The Honourable Richard Bourke (22 April 1767 – 15 November 1832) was an Irish Church of Ireland cleric who was Dean of Ardagh (1800–1813) and the last Bishop of Waterford and Lismore (1813–1832) before it merged with the defunct Ecclesiastical Province of Cashel.

Early life
Born into an aristocratic family, Bourke was the second son of Joseph Bourke, 3rd Earl of Mayo and his wife Elizabeth Meade, the daughter of Richard Meade, 3rd Baronet. He was educated at Christ Church, Oxford.

Career
Bourke was appointed Prebendary of Tuam in 1791, Rector of Templemichael and of Mohill in 1795 and became Dean of Ardagh in 1800 before his elevation to the episcopacy. He was nominated to the See of Waterford and Lismore on 25 August 1813 and consecrated on 10 October 1813.

Family
Bourke married Frances Fowler (d.1827) on 20 March 1795, and they had four children: Frances, Mildred, Catherine, and Robert (later 5th Earl of Mayo).

Notes

1767 births
1832 deaths
House of Burgh
Alumni of Christ Church, Oxford
Bishops of Waterford and Lismore (Church of Ireland)
19th-century Anglican bishops in Ireland
Deans of Ardagh